George Skaroulis (born August 15, 1963) is a Greek-American pianist, who has released 16 albums of music.

Early life
Skaroulis was born in 1963 in Clearwater, Florida. His mother was a classically trained pianist and he began playing piano at the age of five. Although he experienced shyness and stage fright, he later began performing in piano stores at the local mall, accompanied by his father, and entered annual talent shows at school.

At the age of ten, his parents encouraged him to take piano lessons, but he quit after five weeks after his teacher discovered he was playing by ear. From then on Skaroulis taught himself piano by practising.

Career
As a teenager, Skaroulis studied culinary arts, and followed his Greek grandfather into the restaurant industry, where he worked for over 20 years. Privately, he continued to play piano, composing his own songs. After moving to Atlanta, Georgia, he recorded his debut album, Homeland, in 1996, before establishing his own record label, Evzone Music.

After releasing four albums, Skaroulis left the restaurant industry to pursue music full-time. He has since released 16 albums, as well as two books of sheet music of his original compositions. His more recent releases include Sanctuary 2 on June 2, 2015, and Shine in November 2017, which includes versions of songs by Bonnie Raitt, George Perris, Billy Joel, Sam Smith, Roberta Flack, and Lara Fabian.

Skaroulis's music has also been used on several PBS documentaries, and elsewhere as backing music on TV and radio. His Christmas album, Season Traditions, was described as Best Holiday Album of 2011 by solopiano.com. In mid-2014, George's song "Fragile" was named one of the top 50 new age solo piano compositions by ReviewsNewAge.com

Charity work
Skaroulis is the official musician of the Atlanta Humane Society, which uses his music to calm animals in their care. He has played several fundraising concerts for the organization. Skaroulis also collaborated with author Jennifer Skiff, to create the soundtrack for her book, The Divinity of Dogs, entitled The Divinity of Dogs: Music to calm dogs and the people who love them.

Discography
Skaroulis's 16 CD releases include Homeland, Numinous, Season Traditions, Athena, Generations, Second Nature, Return to Homeland, Snow, Forever Young, Adagio: the music of Chris Spheeris, Sanctuary, Reunion, Imagine, and Songs for Sophie.

References

External links
 AllMusic page

1963 births
Living people
People from Clearwater, Florida
20th-century American pianists
American male pianists
21st-century American pianists
20th-century American male musicians
21st-century American male musicians